was a district located in Ishikawa Prefecture, Japan.

As of 2003, the district had an estimated population of 32,915 and a density of 58.73 persons per square kilometer. The total area was 560.42 km2.

Towns and villages
Before the Hōsu District merger, the district had three towns and one village:

 Anamizu
 Monzen
 Noto
 Yanagida

History

Recent mergers
 On March 1, 2005 - The former town of Noto and the village of Yanagida were merged with the town of Uchiura (from Suzu District) to create the new town of Noto. Therefore, both districts were merged to create Hōsu District and were dissolved.

See also
 List of dissolved districts of Japan

Former districts of Ishikawa Prefecture